Someone Behind the Door is a 1971 French crime-drama film directed by Nicolas Gessner.  In the UK, it was twice retitled as Two Minds For Murder (theatrical title) and Brainkill (VHS title).  The film was shot on location in Folkestone, England.

Plot
A neurosurgeon and psychiatrist manipulates an amnesiac to murder his wife's lover, believing that the patient will have no memory of what he has done, providing the surgeon with a perfect alibi.

Cast

Production

Filming
Almost all of the film was shot at various locations in Folkestone. Key locations include Folkestone Harbour and Beach.

Controversy
When Charles Bronson appeared on the Dick Calvert Show, with fellow guests Richard Attenborough and Jill Ireland (Bronson’s wife) he confirmed that this was one story about his attacking a director that was true. On the last day of filming his frustration at the director, whom he believed had stuck doggedly to a poor plan of how to film the story, boiled over, he grabbed Nicolas Gessner by the throat, and gave him a shake. Jill Ireland confirmed this and agreed with Bronson’s assessment of Gessner, “He was a bit thick”

References

External links 

1971 films
1971 crime drama films
1970s psychological thriller films
Films about amnesia
Films about psychiatry
Films directed by Nicolas Gessner
Films set in Kent
Films shot in Kent
English-language French films
1970s English-language films
1970s French films